Carpathonesticus lotriensis  is an araneomorph spider species of the family Nesticidae. It occurs in Romania, where it can be found in caves.

Description
The prosoma length is 2 mm in male and female specimens of C. lotriensis. The described female had a body length of 5.2 mm; male body length is 4.7 mm. Body colouration and patterning are similar to that of other species of Carpathonesticus.

Original publication

References 

Nesticidae
Spiders of Europe
Spiders described in 1983